How Doth the Little Crocodile is both a painting and an outdoor bronze sculpture by British-born Mexican surrealist artist Leonora Carrington.

Carrington first painted How Doth the Little Crocodile in 1998. The statue was cast around that time and in 2000, it was donated to the government of Mexico City, who installed it in a pond at Chapultepec Park, in the Miguel Hidalgo borough. The sculpture was relocated in 2006 to Paseo de la Reforma Avenue, in the Cuauhtémoc borough, in downtown Mexico City.

Both artworks were inspired by and named after the 1865 poem "How Doth the Little Crocodile", written by Lewis Carroll for his novel Alice's Adventures in Wonderland.

History

Background and description

Leonora Carrington (1917–2011) was a British surrealist artist who established in Mexico during the World War II era. She mainly worked as a painter and it was not until 1994 that she started to sculpt, after the insistence of Isaac Masri, a Mexican art promoter. In one year, she had sculpted eight works. Carrington and Masri included them in the exhibition "Freedom in Bronze 2000".

In 1998, Carrington painted How Doth the Little Crocodile, which features five small crocodiles sailing on a large crocodile boat that is being propelled with a paddle by another crocodile. How Doth the Little Crocodile was based on and named after "How Doth the Little Crocodile", an 1865 poem written by Lewis Carroll for his novel Alice's Adventures in Wonderland.

Carrington presented Masri with a representation of How Doth the Little Crocodile, which Masri recalled was "done completely in paper wrapped in cloth", and he added:

Installation and relocation

After the sculpture was cast, she donated it to the government of Mexico City. Masri insisted it had to stand on the water as the work depicts aquatic animals in an aquatic setup. Cuauhtémoc Cárdenas, then-head of government, decided to pay homage to Carrington and her contributions to the city, who accepted it as long as it was a small event. The selected space was in the middle of a pond at the second section of Chapultepec Park, formerly occupied by a fountain whose systems were never plugged. The government remodelled the area, erased the graffiti in the zone and it was illuminated. How Doth the Little Crocodile was placed in March 2000 in a ceremony where Carrington was recognised as "Woman of Distinction" by the city.

According to Masri, one day Carrington visited Crocodile and noticed that several parked trucks were obstructing the view. Carrington herself proposed a relocation site as the sculpture could be more in touch with the public. In March 2006, the sculpture was relocated to a fountain in the corner of Havre Street and Paseo de la Reforma Avenue, next to Reforma 222.

Impact
The painting was featured as a Google Doodle on 6 April 2015.

Notes

References

External links

 
 
 
 

1998 paintings
2000 establishments in Mexico
2000 sculptures
Animal sculptures in Mexico
Bronze sculptures in Mexico
Cuauhtémoc, Mexico City
Outdoor sculptures in Mexico City
Paintings by Leonora Carrington
Paintings in Mexico
Paseo de la Reforma
Reptiles in art
Statues in Mexico City
Surrealist works
Works based on Alice in Wonderland